Gorz may refer to:
 Gorz, Iran, a village in Sistan and Baluchestan Province, Iran
 Gorizia (German name Görz), a town and comune in northeastern Italy
 André Gorz (1923 – 2007), pen name of Gérard Horst, Austrian/French philosopher